Všestary is a municipality and village in Prague-East District in the Central Bohemian Region of the Czech Republic. It has about 1,000 inhabitants.

Administrative parts
The village of Menčice is an administrative part of Všestary.

References

Villages in Prague-East District